ANF may refer to:

Companies
 ANF (real estate), a French property-management company
 ANF Les Mureaux, a French aircraft manufacturer 1918–1937
 Ateliers du Nord de la France, a French locomotive manufacturer
 Abercrombie & Fitch (NYSE symbol), an American clothing retailer
 Firat News Agency (Ajansa Nûçeyan a Firatê), a Kurdish news agency
 WANF, Atlanta News First, an Atlanta-area CBS television affiliate; formerly CBS46 (WGCL-TV)

Federations and other organisations
 Association d'entraide de la noblesse française, an official French organization for valid descendants of the French nobility
 Australian Newsagents' Federation, a chain of newsagencies in Australia
 Australian Nursing Federation, the national union for nurses in Australia

Places
 Allegheny National Forest, near Erie, Pennsylvania
 Angeles National Forest, near Los Angeles, California
 Ashurst New Forest railway station (National Rail code), Ashurst, Hampshire, England
 Cerro Moreno Airport (IATA code), Antofagasta, Chile

Science, technology, mathematics, and medicine
 Administrative Normal Form, a representation used in computing
 Agitated Nutsche Filter, a type of filter for liquid
 Algebraic normal form, a method of standardizing and normalizing logical formulas
 A-normal form, an intermediate representation of programs in functional compilers 
 Anti-nuclear antibody, or anti-nuclear factor in blood
 Array Network Facility, a component of the EarthScope USArray project
 Atrial natriuretic peptide, or atrial natriuretic factor, a hormone

Other uses
 America Needs Fatima, a campaign of the American TFP
 Anti-Narcotics Force, a law enforcement agency in Pakistan